Podarcis levendis is a species of lizard in the family Lacertidae. It is endemic to Greece.

References

Podarcis
Reptiles described in 2008
Endemic fauna of Greece
Taxa named by Petros Lymberakis
Taxa named by Nikos Poulakakis
Taxa named by Antigoni Kaliontzopoulou
Taxa named by Efstratios Valakos
Taxa named by Moisis Mylonas